San José is a municipality in the La Unión department of El Salvador.

San José, also known as San José La Fuente, is a municipality of the department of La Unión in El Salvador

The Cantones("Neighborhoods" or "boroughs") within the municipality consist of the following: La Chacara, El Valle Nuevo, El Sapote, El Chagüite, La Joya, Las Pilas, La Bolsa, and El Sombrero.

Municipalities of the La Unión Department